Calcochloris is a genus of mammal in the family Chrysochloridae. 
It contains the following species:
 Yellow golden mole (Calcochloris obtusirostris)
 Somali golden mole (Calcochloris tytonis)

References

Afrosoricida
Mammal genera
Taxa named by St. George Jackson Mivart
Taxonomy articles created by Polbot